The 12th Pennsylvania Reserve Regiment also known as the 41st Pennsylvania Volunteer Infantry was an infantry regiment that served in the Union Army as part of the Pennsylvania Reserves infantry division during the American Civil War.

Organization

Service
The 12th Pennsylvania Reserves was organized at Camp Curtin in Harrisburg, Pennsylvania beginning August 1861 and mustered in August 10, 1861 under the command of Colonel John H. Taggart.

The regiment was attached to 3rd Brigade, McCall's Pennsylvania Reserves Division, Army of the Potomac, to March 1862. 3rd Brigade, 2nd Division, I Corps, Army of the Potomac, to April 1862. 3rd Brigade, McCall's Division, Department of the Rappahannock, to June 1862. 3rd Brigade, 3rd Division, V Corps, Army of the Potomac, to August 1862. 3rd Brigade, 3rd Division, III Corps, Army of Virginia, to September 1862. 3rd Brigade, 3rd Division, I Corps, Army of the Potomac, to February 1863. 3rd Brigade, Pennsylvania Reserves Division, XXII Corps, Department of Washington, to June 1863. 3rd Brigade, 3rd Division, V Corps, Army of the Potomac, to June 1864.

The 12th Pennsylvania Reserves mustered out June 11, 1864.

Detailed service
At Camp Curtin until August 10. Moved to Washington, D.C., then to Tennallytown, Md., August 10–13. Duty at Tennallytown, Md., August 13 to October 10, 1861, and at Camp Pierpont, near Langley, Va., to March 1862. Expedition to Grinnell's Farm December 6, 1861. Action at Dranesville December 20, 1861. Advance on Manassas, Va., March 10–15, 1862. McDowell's advance on Falmouth April 9–19. Duty at Fredericksburg until June. Moved to White House June 9–12. Seven Days before Richmond June 25 – July 1. Battle of Mechanicsville June 26, Battle of Gaines's Mill June 27, Battle of Charles City Cross Roads, Glendale June 30, and Battle of Malvern Hill July 1. At Harrison's Landing until August 16. Movement to join Pope August 16–26. Battle of Gainesville August 28. Battle of Groveton August 30. Second Battle of Bull Run August 30. Maryland Campaign September 6–24. Battle of South Mountain September 14. Battle of Antietam September 16–17. Duty in Maryland until October 30. Movement to Falmouth, Va., October 30 – November 19. Battle of Fredericksburg, Va., December 12–15. "Mud March" January 20–24, 1863. Ordered to Washington, D.C., February 6, and duty there and at Alexandria until June 25. Ordered to rejoin the Army of the Potomac in the field. Battle of Gettysburg, July 1–3. Pursuit of Lee July 5–24. Duty on the Rapidan until October. Bristoe Campaign October 9–22. Advance to line of the Rappahannock November 7–8. Rappahannock Station November 7. Mine Run Campaign November 26 – December 2. Guarded the Orange & Alexandria Railroad until April 1864. Rapidan Campaign May 4–31. Battle of the Wilderness May 5–7. Laurel Hill May 8. Spotsylvania May 8–12. Spotsylvania Court House May 12–21. Assault on the Salient May 12. Harris Farm May 19. North Anna River May 23–26. Jericho Mills, or Ford, May 25. Line of the Pamunkey May 26–28. Totopotomoy May 28–31.

Casualties
The regiment lost a total of 181 men during service; 1 officer and 110 enlisted men killed or mortally wounded, 1 officer and 69 enlisted men died of disease.

Commanders
 Colonel John H. Taggart – resigned July 8, 1862, recommissioned August 19, 1862 and mustered out September 23, 1862
 Colonel Martin Davis Hardin – promoted to brigadier general July 2, 1864
 Lieutenant Colonel Richard Gustin – commanded at the battles of Second Bull Run, Antietam, and Fredericksburg while still at the rank of captain after Col. Hardin was promoted to brigade command

See also

 List of Pennsylvania Civil War Units
 Pennsylvania in the Civil War

Notes

References
 
 Jones, William David. The Life and Letters of Corporal William David Jones: 12th Pennsylvania Reserve Volunteers, 1861–1864 (Baltimore, MD: Gateway Press), 2005. 
 
Attribution

External links
 12th Pennsylvania Reserves monument at Gettysburg

Military units and formations established in 1861
Military units and formations disestablished in 1864
Units and formations of the Union Army from Pennsylvania